The Ah Formation  is located in Kuqa County, Xinjiang Uygur Autonomous Region and is dated to the Middle Jurassic period.

References

Geology of Xinjiang
Geologic formations of China
Jurassic System of Asia